Auguste Duport, full name François Auguste Duport, (22 January 1777 – 5 September 1843) was a French playwright.

Originally a carpenter, he embraced literature and his plays were performed at the Théâtre du Gymnase dramatique, at the Théâtre de l'Opéra-Comique and at the Théâtre-Français.

Selected works
1820 : Le Frère Philippe, opéra comique in one act, with Victor Dourlen
1824 : Le Beau-frère, ou la Veuve à deux maris, comédie-vaudeville in one act, with Paul Duport and Amable de Saint-Hilaire,
1824 : Une journée de Charles V, comédie in one act and in prose, with P. Duport
1834 : Le Marchand forain, opéra-comique in three acte, with Eugène Planard

Bibliography 
 Annuaire dramatique de la Belgique, volumes 5 à 6, 1843 (obituary) (Read online)

19th-century French dramatists and playwrights
French librettists
Writers from Paris
1777 births
1843 deaths